Yuttana Mano (born 26 March 1997) is a Thai cyclist, who currently rides for UCI Continental team .

Major results
2015
 2nd Time trial, Asian Junior Road Championships
2016
 4th Time trial, Asian Under-23 Road Championships
2018
 5th Time trial, Asian Under-23 Road Championships
2020
 1st Stage 6 Tour of Thailand
 9th Time trial, National Road Championships

References

External links
 
 

1997 births
Living people
Yuttana Mano
Cyclists at the 2018 Asian Games
Yuttana Mano